Babathnil located at 32°31′54″S 147°26′04″ is acadastral parish in Kennedy County New South Wales.

References

Parishes of Kennedy County